Silvio Apponyi  (born 4 July 1949) is an Australian sculptor based in the Adelaide Hills in South Australia, who focuses primarily on Animalier.

Early life and education 

Apponyi was born on 4 July 1949 in a refugee camp in Dachau, near Munich, migrating to Australia during infancy. He claimed his father Albert Frederick (Frigyes) Apponyi descended from an illegitimate line of the Apponyi family.

The family moved to Adelaide, and Apponyi had a difficult home life. He started wood carving when he was about five years old. He attended Woodville High School, where he was encouraged to apply for a scholarship to art school.

Career 
Apponyi studied sculpture at the North Adelaide School of Arts, and during that time won a German Academic Exchange Scholarship (DAAD), and went on to study for a year at the Munich Academy.

Since then he has had one-man shows and group exhibitions locally, interstate and overseas. He has won several prizes, accepted commissions, conducted workshops in Australia and Malaysia, and studied wood-block printmaking under a Japanese master. His work is featured in many private collections both here and overseas and in public spaces across Australia.

Apponyi was awarded the Medal of the Order of Australia (OAM) in the 2020 Queen's Birthday Honours for "service to the visual arts as a sculptor".

Apponyi lives and works from his studio located at Balhannah in South Australia.

Major commissions 
1981: University of Adelaide’s Waite Institute ”Aries”

1985: Goulburn NSW, ”The Big Merino” & St Patrick’s College, Goulburn, life-sized "St Patrick"

1986: St Dominic’s College, North Adelaide "St Dominic"

1988: Tamworth NSW, Bi-centennial Park, 67 stone sculptures & reliefs

1989: State Bank Tower, Adelaide "laminated Wooden Relief"

1990: Mt Annan Botanic Garden NSW, sundial of human involvement – with Sundials SA, Flinders University of SA, bronze & marble \”Squid & Prey\”
Kingston SE SA, Maria Creek beautification, granite sculptures & sundial
Berri SA, \”A Special Place for Jimmy James\” – with Bluey Roberts

1991 – 2006: Mitsubishi National Basketball League Trophy

1992: Henley Beach Catholic Church, "Mary with Child" (RAIA Award), Granite Island "Sea lion carved in Situ" & Healesville Sanctuary, Victoria ”Laughing Kookaburras"

1993: Adelaide Zoo "Sealion", Victor Harbor ”Whale Tail”, Flinders University ”Woman Washing her Hair", Ashford Special School "Relief Carving on Granite" Townsend School for the Blind, "Birdbath with Bronze Tortoise"

1994: Keswick SA "Wedgetailed Eagle" Regency College of TAFE "Marine Sculpture"

1996: Wagga Wagga "Waterbirds & Goannas", Lutheran Homes "Granite Fountain", Healesville Sanctuary "Kangaroo and Emu with Chicks"

1997: Spring Hill Estate SA, wooden carvings, stone reliefs, bronze sculptures, Burnside Shopping Village, Granite Fountain
Monarto Zoological Park SA, granite & bronze goanna birdbath (donated by the artist)

1998: Dudley Park SA, Children\’s Cemetery, bronze Pelican & Chicks
Eden Hills SA, Colebrook Home site, granite \”Fountain of Tears\”collaboration with indigenous artists

1999: BRL Hardy\’s Banrock Station Wine & Wetlands Centre, Kingston-on-Murray SA, bronze Pelican & Chicks
University of Adelaide\’s Waite Institute, bronze West Highland White Terrier for Greg Johns\’ tribute to Mr Waite
Eden Hills SA, Colebrook Home site, life-sized bronze \”Grieving Mother\” collaboration with Shereen Rankine
Darwin NT, Heritage Walk drinking fountain with Chinese theme, collaboration with Aladar Apponyi

2000: Thredbo Village NSW, life-sized bronze Eastern Wombat & Grey Kangaroo
Gilles Street Primary School, Adelaide, Demonstrated granite-carving on boulders which form landscaping for C. Lawrence\’s mural
Cleland Wildlife Park, Adelaide Hills SA, life-sized bronze Koala

2001: Parliament House, Canberra, green marble Lizard
Burnside Shopping Village SA, granite water feature with 3 elements

2002: Victor Harbor SA, bronze Penguins for gateway to Granite Island (\”Kaiki\”), w Martin Corbin
SANBL Headquarters, bronze bust of former player Mark Davis
Mikawomma Reserve, Woodville Gdns SA, series of relief carvings. Collaboration w Potter/Minuzzo.
Design Institute Award

2003: Mt Gambier SA, Kimberley Clark foyer, limestone relief, Red-Tailed Black Cockatoos for Landscaping

2004: North Adelaide SA, St Dominic\’s Priory College, Water Feature and Relief of Young Kaurna girl

2005: Adelaide Convention Centre, River Torrens Precinct, Meals on Wheels 50th Anniversary SA, 2.6m x 4m granite relief
Scotch College, Torrens Park SA, granite relief \”Technology and Science\”

2006: Mt Barker District Council Walking Trail SA, Redgum Mother & Toddler \”Catherine & Allana\” carved in situ

2007: September	Maroochy Qld, 3 week residency to carve granite sculptures for Botanic Gardens.

2007: October	to Elliston, Eyre Peninsula to give workshops at Sculpture on the Cliffs, Mt Gambier SA, \”Memories in a Suitcase\”, 2m high granite memorial to migrant settlers

2009: Peterborough SA, \”Bob the Railway Dog\’

2010: February	St Mark\’s College, North Adelaide, \”Flame of Learning\” white marble column.

References

German sculptors
German male sculptors
21st-century Australian sculptors
1949 births
Living people
20th-century Australian sculptors
Recipients of the Medal of the Order of Australia